The 1962 Michigan Wolverines football team was an American football team that represented the University of Michigan in the 1962 Big Ten Conference football season.  In its fourth year under head coach Bump Elliott, Michigan compiled a 2–7 record (1–6 against conference opponents), finished in last place in the Big Ten, and were outscored by opponents by a combined total of 214 to 70.

The highlight of the season was a 17–7 victory over No. 10 Army, as Michigan took advantage of five Army turnovers (four interceptions and a fumble) in the second game of the season.

Bob Brown was the team captain, and Dave Raimey was selected for the team's most valuable player award. The team's statistical leaders included Bob Chandler with 401 passing yards, Dave Raimey with 385 rushing yards, and Harvey Chapman with 223 receiving yards.

Schedule

Season summary

Presesason

Nebraska

Army

    
    
    
    

On October 6, Michigan defeated No. 10 Army by a 17–7 before a crowd of 70,749 at Michigan Stadium. The Wolverines intercepted four Army passes and gave up only four Army completions. Jack Strobel scored Michigan's first touchdown on a one-yard run in the first quarter. Dave Raimey scored the Wolverines' second touchdown in the third quarter. Bob Timberlake added a 25-yard field goal and two extra points. Carl Stichweh scored for Army on 73-yard punt return in the fourth quarter. Michigan totaled 276 rushing yards in the game while holding Army to 92 rushing yards.

Michigan State

Purdue

Minnesota

Wisconsin

Illinois

    
    
    
    

On November 10, Michigan defeated Illinois by a 14–10 before a crowd of 49,756 at Michigan Stadium. The Illini scored 10 points in the second quarter to take a 10-0 lead at halftime. Michigan converted only three first downs in the first half. In the third quarter, Dave Raimey led the Wolverines down the field on a drive capped by a four-yard touchdown pass from Bob Chandler to Bob Timberlake. Michigan attempted a two-point conversion but Chandler was tackled while trying to pass. On the next Illinois drive, Michigan end Ben Farabee intercepted an Illinois pass and returned it to the one-yard line. Chandler ran one yard for the go-ahead touchdown. The Wolverines completed the scoring with a two-point conversion on a pass from Chandler to Harvey Champman. Illinois' final two drives also ended in turnovers: a Tom Keating interception and a Jim Green fumble recovery.

Iowa

Ohio State

Statistical leaders

Michigan's individual statistical leaders for the 1962 season include those listed below.

Rushing

Passing

Receiving

Kickoff returns

Punt returns

Personnel

Letter winners
The following players won varsity letters for their participation on the 1962 football team. Players who started at least four games are shown with their names in bold.
 Mel Anthony, 5'11", 195 pounds, sophomore, Cincinnati - fullback
 Donald Blanchard, 6'3", 233 pounds, junior, Sturgis, MI
Bob Brown, 6'5", 226 pounds, senior, Kalamazoo, MI – started 6 games at left end 
Robert Chandler, 6'3", 199 pounds, junior, LaGrange, IL – started 2 games at quarterback  
Harvey Chapman, 5'11", 180 pounds, junior, Farmington Hills, MI – started 3 games at right halfback, 1 game at left halfback 
Jim Conley, 6'3", 193 pounds, sophomore, Springdale, PA – started 3 games at left end  
Bill Dodd, 5'11", 203 pounds, junior, Virden, IL – started 4 games at fullback 
 Forest Evashevski Jr., 6'0", 182 pounds, junior, Iowa City, IA - quarterback
Ben Farabee, 6'2", 201 pounds, sophomore, Holland, MI - end 
Dave Glinka, 6'0", 194 pounds, senior, Toledo, OH – started 1 game at quarterback  
Jim Green, 6'1", 212 pounds, sophomore, Trenton, MI – started 3 games at center  
 Richard Hahn, 6'0", 195 pounds, sophomore, Norton Village, OH - guard
 Edward Hood, 5'9", 175 pounds, senior, Detroit - halfback
 Dennis Jones, 6'2", 191 pounds, sophomore, Worthington, OH - halfback
Tom Keating, 6'3", 206 pounds, junior, Chicago – started 8 games at left tackle 
Ron Kocan, 5'11", 203 pounds, senior Sharpsville, PA – started 3 games at right end  
 David Kovacevich, 5'10", 203 pounds, junior, Chicago - guard
 John Kowalik, 5'10", 181 pounds, senior, Detroit - halfback
Dave Kurtz, 6'0", 204 pounds, junior, Toledo, OH – started 8 games at right guard 
Bill Laskey, 6'1", 206 pounds, sophomore, Milan, MI – started 5 games at right end 
 Gerald Mader, 6'3", 217 pounds, sophomore, Chicago - tackle
John Marcum, 6'0", 205 pounds, junior, Monroe, MI – started 1 game at right guard 
John Minko, 6'1", 226 pounds, senior, Connellsville, PA – started 9 games at left guard 
William Muir, 6'0", 200 pounds, junior, Cuyahoga Falls, OH – started 4 games at center 
Joe O'Donnell, 6'2", 219 pounds, senior, Milan, MI – started 9 games at right tackle 
Lou Pavloff, 6'0", 210 pounds, senior, Hazel Park, MI – started 1 game at center 
Tom Prichard, 5'10", 180 pounds, junior, Marion, OH – started 3 games at left halfback 
Dave Raimey, 5'10", 195 pounds, senior, Dayton, OH – started 4 games at right halfback 
Dick Rindfuss, 6'1", 188 pounds, sophomore, Niles, OH – started 2 games at right halfback 
 Richard Schram, 6'1", 220 pounds, senior, Jackson, MI - tackle
 Arnie Simkus, 6'4", 225 pounds, sophomore, Detroit - tackle
Wayne Sparkman, 5'11", 189 pounds, junior, Plymouth, MI – started 5 games at fullback 
Jack Strobel, 5'9", 175 pounds, junior, Maywood, IL – started 3 games at left halfback  
Dick Szymanski, 5'10", 187 pounds, senior, Toledo, OH – started 1 game at center 
Bob Timberlake, 6'4", 200 pounds, sophomore, Franklin, OH – started 6 games at quarterback, 2 games at left halfback  
Jim Ward, 6'1", 196 pounds, senior, Imlay City, MI – started 1 game at right end
 Paul Woodward, 6'2", 221 pounds, junior, Cincinnati - tackle
 John Yanz, 6'2", 201 pounds, junior, Chicago - end

Non-letter winners
 John Houtman, 6'4", 229 pounds, senior, Adrian, MI – started 1 game at left tackle

Freshmen
 Tom Cecchini, 6'0", 195 pounds, freshman, Detroit - center
 Jack Clancy, 6'1", 190 pounds, freshman, Detroit - quarterback
 Jeffrey Hoyne, 6'1", 195 pounds, freshman, Chicago - end
 Bill Keating, 6'1", 220 pounds, freshman, Chicago - tackle
 Tom Mack, 6'3", 220 pounds, freshman, Buyrus, OH - end
 John Rowser, 6'0", 175 pounds, freshman, Detroit - halfback
 Stephen C. Smith, 6'5" 230 pounds, freshman, Park Ridge, IL - end
 Dick Sygar, 5'11", 176 pounds, freshman, Niles, OH - halfback
 Bill Yearby, 6'3", 220 pounds, freshman, Detroit - tackle

Coaching staff
Head coach: Bump Elliott
Assistant coaches: 
 Don Dufek, Sr. - freshmen coach
 Henry Fonde - backfield coach
 Jack Fouts - interior line coach
 Bob Hollway - line coach
 Jack Nelson - ends coach
Trainer: Jim Hunt
Manager: Anthony Klain

Awards and honors
Captain: Bob Brown
Most Valuable Player: Dave Raimey
Meyer Morton Award: John Minko
John Maulbetsch Award: Bob Timberlake

See also
 1962 in Michigan

References

Michigan
Michigan Wolverines football seasons
Michigan Wolverines football